Louise Wimmer is a 2011 French drama film directed by Cyril Mennegun.

Plot
Louise Wimmer barely scrapes a living and has to resort to living in her constantly malfunctioning car. Eventually an efficient social security officer jump starts her life with the prospect of a new home.

Cast 
 Corinne Masiero as Louise Wimmer
 Jérôme Kircher as Didier
 Anne Benoit as Nicole
 Marie Kremer as Séverine
 Jean-Marc Roulot as Paul
 Frédéric Gorny as hotel manager
 Maud Wyler as Jessica Wimmer

Accolades

References

External links 

2011 drama films
French drama films
2011 directorial debut films
2011 films
Best First Feature Film César Award winners
Louis Delluc Prize winners
2010s French-language films
2010s French films